Xylophanes ferotinus is a moth of the  family Sphingidae. It is known from Brazil.

The length of the forewings is about 31 mm. It is similar to Xylophanes tersa tersa but differs in the olive-green ground colour and a median band on the hindwing upperside consisting of small, brown spots. The hindwing is slightly broader and apically more rounded. The upperside of the antennae is scaled dark grey, becoming paler distally. The forewing upperside is as in Xylophanes tersa tersa, but the ground colour is olive green. The hindwing upperside is also as in Xylophanes tersa tersa, but the median band spots are smaller and as long as they are wide.

Adults have been recorded from October to November in Amazonas at elevations of 1,550 meters but are probably on wing year-round.

The larvae possibly feed on Psychotria panamensis, Psychotria nervosa and Pavonia guanacastensis.

References

ferotinus
Moths described in 1930
Endemic fauna of Venezuela
Moths of South America